Trochodendron nastae is an extinct species of flowering plant in the family Trochodendraceae known from fossil leaves found in the early Eocene Ypresian stage Klondike Mountain Formation deposits of northern Washington state.  T. nastae is one of the oldest members of the genus Trochodendron, which includes the living species T. aralioides, native to Japan, southern Korea and Taiwan and the coeval extinct species T. drachukii from the McAbee Fossil Beds near Cache Creek, British Columbia.

Taxonomy
Description of the new species by Dr. Kathleen B. Pigg, Wesley Wehr, and Stefanie Ickert-Bond was based on the study of 11 complete and 55 partial compression fossil specimens with the holotype specimen, number "SR 98-02-01", being housed in the Stonerose Interpretive Center, Republic, Washington.  They published their 2001 type description of the species in the International Journal of Plant Sciences volume number 162. and named the species nastae in honor of Charlotte G. Nast for her work on extinct and living members of the Trochodendrales. 

T. nastae has been placed in the genus Trochodendron based on the overall shape of the leaves, the secondary vein structure, which forms weak chevrons bracing primary veins, and the tertiary veins forming four to five sided cells.  However the primary veins are palmate in structure for T.nastae rather than being pinnate as in T. aralioides. 

Trochodendron shares with Tetracentron the very unusual feature in angiosperms, of lacking vessel elements in its wood. This has long been considered a very primitive character, resulting in the classification of these two genera in a basal position in the angiosperms; however, genetic research by the Angiosperm Phylogeny Group has shown it to be in a less basal position (early in the eudicots), suggesting that the absence of vessel elements is a secondarily evolved character, not a primitive one.

References

Trochodendrales
Plants described in 2001
Ypresian plants of North America
Extinct flora of North America
Fossil taxa described in 2001
Klondike Mountain Formation